Penicillium aethiopicum is a fungus species of the genus of Penicillium. Penicillium aethiopicum produces viridicatumtoxin and griseofulvin, two structurally interesting polyketides.

See also
List of Penicillium species

References

Further reading
 Polyphasic Taxonomy of subgenus penicillium J.C. Frisvad & R. A. Samson

aethiopicum
Fungi described in 1989